Sir Laurence Howard  was the Lord Lieutenant of Rutland.  He was appointed in 2003 in succession to Air Chief Marshal Sir Thomas Kennedy, having served as a deputy lieutenant since 1997.  He is  a former chairman of the Central Council of Magistrates' Courts Committees, serving on the bench in Leicestershire for 25 years.  He was also the honorary air commodore of 504 County of Nottingham Squadron for ten years, ending in 2018.

Howard was born in the south of England, took his degree in physiological science at University of Nottingham and his PhD in neurophysiology at Leicester. He joined Leicester University in 1974 and was appointed as sub-dean to the medical school, and subsequently as sub-dean of the Faculty of Medicine and Biological Sciences. He retired from the university in 2006.

He was appointed Knight Commander of the Royal Victorian Order (KCVO) in the 2017 Birthday Honours.

External links
 Rutland On Line

References

Year of birth missing (living people)
Living people
Academics of the University of Leicester
Alumni of the University of Nottingham
Alumni of the University of Leicester
Deputy Lieutenants of Rutland
Lord-Lieutenants of Rutland
Officers of the Order of the British Empire
Knights Commander of the Royal Victorian Order